Stewartia pseudocamellia, also known as Korean stewartia, Japanese stewartia, or deciduous camellia, is a species of flowering plant in the family Theaceae, native to Japan (southern Honshū, Kyūshū, Shikoku) and Korea.

Names
It is called natsutsubaki("summer camellia") in Japanese, and nogaknamu("overripe cucumber tree") in Korean.

The Latin specific epithet pseudocamellia references the flower’s resemblance to the related camellia.

Description
It is a small to medium sized deciduous tree, growing to 10–15 m (rarely to 18 m) tall often with multiple stems and/or low branching trunks. The bark is smooth textured, exfoliating as the plants age, and has a camouflaged or mottled appearance with patterns of dull orange and green with grey mixed in. The trees are pyramidal to rounded in shape with deep green coloured foliage. Young stems have a zig-zag shape with flattened, divergent buds. The leaves are 4–12 cm long and 2.5–5 cm broad, arranged alternately on the stems with an elliptical shape and finely serrated edges. In the fall the foliage turns yellow, red or purple. The flowers are up to 8 cm wide, with five white petals with orange anthers; they are shaped like those of the related Camellia, round and flat to somewhat cupped. They are produced in summer, generally in June until the end of August; each flower is short-lived, but many are produced that open over many weeks. The fruit is a brown capsule, triangular in shape with four or five angles, persistent on the trees but not showy.

Varieties
There are two varieties:
Stewartia pseudocamellia var. japonica Maxim. Japan. Flowers open cup-shaped.
Stewartia pseudocamellia var. koreana (Nakai ex Rehd.) Sealy. Korea. Flowers open flat. Often treated as a separate species S. koreana Nakai ex Rehd., mainly in Korea.

Cultivation
Stewartia pseudocamellia is an attractive ornamental tree that grows best in rich organic soils with good drainage and consistent moisture throughout the year. It is grown in full sun, but under hot and dry conditions it grows best in some light shade during the afternoon. It is used as a specimen planting in shrub borders or as a specimen in lawn plantings, having year round interest. It can be temperamental to establish and younger trees transplant best. When grown with single trunks they form taller more pyramidal shaped trees, when having multiple trunks plants tend to grow shorter and spread out wider.

In the UK this plant, and the Koreana Group, have received the Royal Horticultural Society's Award of Garden Merit.

Gallery

References

pseudocamellia
Trees of Korea